Sir Henry Jackson, 1st Baronet (22 August 1875 – 23 February 1937) was a British mineralogist and later Conservative Party politician.

He was elected at the 1924 general election as the member of parliament (MP) for Wandsworth Central, but was narrowly defeated at the 1929 general election by the Labour Party candidate, Archibald Church. At the next election, in 1931, Church did not stand again, and Jackson retook the seat with a large majority. He was re-elected in 1935, and held the seat until his death in 1937, aged 61.

He was knighted on 1 March 1924, and made a baronet on 4 July 1935 for "services in connection with transport questions". The title became extinct on his death.

References

External links 

1875 births
1937 deaths
Baronets in the Baronetage of the United Kingdom
Conservative Party (UK) MPs for English constituencies
UK MPs 1924–1929
UK MPs 1931–1935
UK MPs 1935–1945